Emma Jones (born 23 May 1975) is a Welsh journalist.

Education
She attended Mold Alun School and Staffordshire University.

Career
She joined the Evening Leader newspaper in her home town of Mold.

Jones worked on a variety of stories, from hard news to showbiz at the Sunday Mirror, then The Mail On Sunday and The Sun. She worked as editor of Smash Hits magazine in 2001, but returned to The Sun in 2002 to become its youngest columnist.  Jones was twice nominated for the UK Press Gazette Young Journalist of the Year Award, and the then editor of The Sun David Yelland described her as "the brightest young female voice in Britain".

On 28 July 2018 Jones published her first novel Supernova Hangover.

Broadcast media 
Jones was a regular contributor to radio and TV, twice co-presenting the National TV Awards for ITV2 with Tess Daly.

References 

1975 births
Living people
Alumni of Staffordshire University
Daily Mail journalists
Daily Mirror people
People from Mold, Flintshire
The Sun (United Kingdom) people
Welsh journalists
Welsh women journalists
People educated at Alun School, Mold